Stidham can refer to:
 Arbee Stidham (1917–1988), American musician
 Ari Stidham (born 1992), American actor
 Brian Stidham (1967–2004), American murder victim
 Haleigh Stidham (born 1983), American beauty queen
 Howard Stidham (born 1954), American football player
 Jarrett Stidham (born 1996), American football player
 Phil Stidham (born 1968), American former baseball player
 Thomas E. Stidham (1905–1964), American football player and coach

See also

 Stidham Farm
 Stidham, Oklahoma